Kumkuma is a 2005 Indian Telugu-language family drama film directed by Jyothindranath Vemuri and starring Seema (lead debut), Siva Balaji and newcomer Jayant.

Cast 
 Seema as Madhuri
Siva Balaji as Karthik
Jayant as Vamsi
Ranganath as Jayant's father

Soundtrack 
The music is composed by Ghantadi Krishna.

Reception 
B. Anuradha of Rediff.com said that "However, he [Vemuri] deserves some credit -- for attempting a female-centric film in the male-dominated Telegu film industry". Jeevi of Idlebrain.com opined that "On a whole, Kunkuma is a boring and sluggish flick".

References 

2000s Telugu-language films
2005 drama films
Indian drama films